Alonso Manso (1460 – September 27, 1539) was a Roman Catholic prelate who served as the first Bishop of Puerto Rico (1511–1539), and first Bishop of Magua (1504–1511), and as the eighth governor of Puerto Rico.

Biography
Alonso Manso was born in Becerril de Campos, Spain and studied theology at the University of Salamanca. He became the canon of Salamanca and the chaplain of the prince Don Juan. On November 15, 1504, he was appointed bishop of Magua, Dominican Republic. On August 8, 1511, Pope Julius II created three dioceses in the New World, two in Hispaniola (Santo Domingo and Concepción de la Vega) and one in Puerto Rico (San Juan), and Manso was appointed bishop of the diocese of Puerto Rico. On March 3, 1512, he was consecrated bishop by Diego de Deza, Archbishop of Sevilla.  Before even arriving to Puerto Rico on September 26, 1512, he founded the first school of advanced studies. In 1513, he became the first bishop to arrive in the New World. In 1519, at the request of Bishop Manso the diocese of Puerto Rico was expanded to cover all the Leeward Islands. That same year he was appointed as the first Inquisitor General of the Indies and two years later he directed the construction of the Cathedral of San Juan. However, the cathedral would be completely destroyed by a hurricane in 1539, shortly after his death.

Bishop Manso, as was customary at the time, became involved in politics. He became the eighth governor of Puerto Rico in 1523. However, his stay in power was short lived as he was replaced a year later by Pedro Moreno, the man who, incidentally, he had replaced.

Bishop Manso was the precursor of many acts in the New World. Aside from establishing the first advanced studies school he performed the first episcopal consecration in the New World when in 1529, at the Cathedral of San Juan, he consecrated Sebastián Ramírez de Fuenleal, elected bishop of Santo Domingo. He also founded two hospitals, Concepción (which was the first hospital built in Puerto Rico) and San Ildefonso hospital. Bishop Manso died in San Juan, Puerto Rico, in 1539 at the age of 79. He was succeeded as bishop of Puerto Rico by Rodrigo de Bastidas y Rodriguez de Romera in 1541.

References

Catholic Encyclopedia - Porto Rico

External links and additional sources
 (for Chronology of Bishops) 
 (for Chronology of Bishops) 

1460 births
1539 deaths
Royal Governors of Puerto Rico
Spanish Roman Catholic bishops in North America
16th-century Roman Catholic bishops in Puerto Rico
16th-century Roman Catholic bishops in New Spain
15th-century Castilian Roman Catholic priests
University of Salamanca alumni
Colonial Puerto Rico
History of Hispaniola
Spanish West Indies
16th century in Puerto Rico
Roman Catholic bishops of Puerto Rico